Run Baby Run is an 2023 Indian-Tamil-language action thriller film written and directed by Jiyen Krishnakumar. The film stars RJ Balaji and Aishwarya Rajesh. The film was released theatrically on 3 February 2023. The film received positive reviews from critics and audiences.

Plot
Run Baby Run is an investigative thriller starts off with the death of a medical college student called Sophie. 

The story flashes back to 7 days before. A banker called Sathya, who has just got engaged, is on his way to a jewellery store. Looking to surprise his future life partner, Sathya buys her a pair of earrings. Soon after buying the jewellery, he picks up his future wife and looks to impress her with the costly gift, when he suddenly notices another young woman hiding in the back seat of his car. 

Sathya is caught in a catch-22 situation. He cannot continue to drive without knowing who the woman hiding in his car is. At the same time, he cannot stop the car and question the woman, lest his future wife gets the wrong impression. He waits for the opportune moment, which takes quite a while, and finally, when he does get the opportunity, questions her. He finds out that the woman who was hiding in his car is Tara, a medical college student whose life is in danger. She begs him to allow her to stay in his flat until her guardian comes and picks her up in an hour or two. Sathya initially refuses and is adamant about throwing her out. But eventually, he gives in, moved by her plight. He lets her into a guest room and tells her that she doesn’t have to let him know when she leaves with her guardian. However, that turns out to be a horrible mistake.

The next morning, his future father-in-law visits him and he only then notices that Tara’s dupatta and handbag are still where she left it in his living room. He surreptitiously looks in the room where he left her and sees Tara unconscious or dead on the floor. Just then, the police arrive at his flat having been called to investigate a disturbance in the building. 

That night, a Security with a torch climbs up the stairs,the next day,the housemaid tells him that the front door was open. but his friend hides that she is in the restroom. Then he visits his friend who is a police. He says to dispose the body so he will not get into trouble.
He gets ready to dispose the body via car and his car breaks down in the middle. After few incidents he leaves the body in a van where the driver finds and decides to burn them. Next day police arrives to the scene where the driver is caught. He kills himself afraid of being caught. When officials force to close the case by saying victim couldn't be identified and accused killed himself, a honest police decides to enquire and driver's mother tells him the truth. After multiple incidents Sathya decides to investigate Thara's murder. The rest of the story shows how he gets succeeded in this mission

Cast

Production 
On 15 December 2022, it was announced that RJ Balaji and Jiyen Krishnakumar would team up for a film. The film was titled as Run Baby Run and is the first action thriller film of RJ Balaji and the first look poster of the film also was released on the same day. The makers released the glimpse of the film on 11 January 2023 coinciding with the Pongal festival.

Music 
The music of the film is composed by Sam C. S.

Release

Theatrical 
The film released theatrically on 3 February 2023. The trailer of the film was released on 19 January 2023. Run Baby Run was released in UK and Europe by Ahimsa Entertainment.

Home media 
The digital streaming rights of the film were acquired by Disney+ Hotstar, while the satellite rights were sold to Star Vijay.The film is scheduled for its digital premiere on the streaming platform from 10 March 2023.

Reception
Logesh Ramachandran of The Times of India  who gave 3 stars out of 5 stars after reviewing the film stated that,"Run Baby Run has all the ingredients that a crime thriller requires but is not powerful enough to linger in our minds". Praveen Sudevan of The Hindu after reviewing the film wrote "In the end, we are left with these ‘if onlys’". Janani K of India Today who gave 2.5 stars out of 5 stars after reviewing the film stated that,"Run Baby Run exposes a doctored crime in the climax and one would be able to buy the twists as it comes out of nowhere". Haricharan Pudipeddi of Hindustan Times after reviewing the film stated that,"The supporting cast does a decent job in playing their respective parts fittingly". Navein Darshan of Cinema Express rated the film 3 out of 5 stars and wrote "The message Run Baby Run conveys isn't novel either as there have been a couple of films made in the recent past based on the same issue". Kirubhakar Purushothaman of The Indian Express gave the film 3 out of 5 stars and wrote "It is time heroes and filmmakers realise they need not always save the world. Sometimes saving a decent film from becoming a mediocre affair is good enough". A critic for India Herald wrote that "It would have been far more effective if the author had forced us to travel with the murderer right away". Dhanushya of ABP Live rated the film 3.5 out of 5 stars and wrote "Would it have been better if this movie was released directly in OTT instead of watching it in theatres?  This is the opinion of the fans who have seen the film". Ranjani Krishnakumar of Film Companion wrote "That is not to say that Run Baby Run is a bad film. Far from it. It’s a passable film with handful of thrills to offer". A critic for Cinema Vikatan wrote "Run Baby Run settles for being a conventional thriller with many logic holes and no innovative scenes". A critic from Dinamalar rated the film 2.5 out of 5 stars. A critic for News18 wrote "Run Baby Run would have been commendable, had the narrative been carried out in a more vibrant way".

References

External links
 

2020s Tamil-language films
2023 action thriller films
Films scored by Sam C. S.
Indian action thriller films